Yellow Red Koninklijke Voetbalclub Mechelen, often simply called KV Mechelen or KVM, or by their former French name FC Malinois, is a Belgian professional football club based in Mechelen in the Antwerp province. KV Mechelen plays in the Belgian Pro League. They have won four Belgian championships and twice the Belgian Cup, as well as the 1987–88 European Cup Winners' Cup and the 1988 European Super Cup. They collected most of their honours in the 1940s and in the 1980s.

KV Mechelen was founded in 1904 and, in 1921–22, promoted to the first division. After two successive relegation and promotion, they were back for good between 1928–29 and 1955–56. In the 1960s and 1970s, the club had several promotions and relegations between the first and second division. From 1983–84 to 1996–97, they had a successful first division spell, with a title and several second- and third-place finishes. During that period, they also won a European Cup Winners' Cup and they reached the same competition semi-finals as well as the European Cup quarter-finals.

KV Mechelen declined in the late 1990s though they had two more spells at the highest level from 1999–2000 to 2000–01 and in 2002–03. At the end of that season, the club did not receive their Belgian professional football license. They were therefore relegated to the third division with a nine-point penalty. After two promotions in 2004–05 and in 2006–07, KV Mechelen returned to the first division.

The club's outfits are a striped yellow and red shirt with black shorts and socks. They play their home matches at the Argosstadion Achter de Kazerne, where Argos is their stadium sponsor and Achter de Kazerne means 'Behind the Barracks'. The stadium has been named so because there used to be barracks next to stadium. KV Mechelen fans have a long-standing rivalry with KRC Mechelen.

History

Early days
The club was founded in 1904, a few months after the birth of city rival KRC Mechelen. The club had a first successful period in the 1940s. During World War II, in 1943, the club won their first domestic title. The second title came a few years later, in 1946, and in 1948 the club was successful again. After that, the club fell back. In 1954, they managed to finish third, only one point behind champions Anderlecht, but that was their last good season. Two years later, Mechelen was relegated to second division. During the 1960s and the 1970s, Mechelen went up and down between the first and second division.

The club enjoyed a spell of both domestic and European success in the period from 1987 to 1992. During these five seasons, Mechelen won one Belgian championship and one Belgian cup title. They also finished second in the Belgian league twice and lost the Belgian Cup final twice. After winning the domestic cup title in 1987, and hence qualifying for the European Cup Winners' Cup, they completed the extraordinary achievement of winning this tournament in 1988. Mechelen are the last Belgian team that has won a European trophy.

Since 2000
KV Mechelen seemed to be on its way to becoming one of the top clubs in Belgium, but quickly declined when their chairman Cordier (who owned the rights to most of their players) was forced to sell many players due to his company's bad results. On 10 June 2007, the team achieved promotion to the Belgian First Division. Two years later in 2009, KV Mechelen played the final of the Belgian Cup, losing it 2–0 to Genk. One year after that, they stranded in the semi-finals with a 2–2 draw and a 1–0 loss against KAA Gent.

After a successful 2010 and four seasons for the yellow reds, coach Peter Maes decided to leave Malinwa and signed a four-year contract with Lokeren. Malinwa made a deal with Marc Brys to take over from Maes. Marc Brys was coach of FC Den Bosch, a second division team in the Netherlands. After two seasons he was sacked and Harm Van Veldhoven was appointed for the 2012–13 season. Van Veldhoven also could not lead KV Mechelen to Play-off 1, the clubs' recent unspoken ambition. He was fired in December 2013. At the end of the 2013–14 season KV Mechelen appointed Aleksandar Janković as head coach. Despite Janković's inability to lead the club to Play-off 1, Janković left for topclub Standard Liège and Mechelen had to appoint a new manager. The club ended up choosing Yannick Ferrera for the vacant job, who had just been fired as manager of Standard Liège.

Match-fixing and 2017–19 Belgian football fraud scandal
2017 through 2019 proved to be a tumultuous period for the club. After eleven seasons at the highest level, the club was relegated on the last day of the 2017–18 season as a 2–0 win over Waasland-Beveren left them in last place on goal difference, due to Eupen beating Moeskroen by a bigger margin (4–0). During the following season, while the club was very successful on the pitch, winning both the 2018–19 Belgian First Division B and the 2018–19 Belgian Cup, the 2017–19 Belgian football fraud scandal emerged in which the club was accused of match-fixing their final match of the 2017–18 season, allegedly having attempted to bribe certain players and officials of Waasland-Beveren. In March 2019, the club was found guilty and forced to relegate back to the First Division B despite winning promotion, and also denied to take part in the 2019–20 Belgian Cup and 2019–20 UEFA Europa League, the latter for which they had qualified by winning the cup. The club appealed the decision at the Belgian Arbitration Court for Sports which ruled on 10 July 2019 that, in accordance with the rules set by the Royal Belgian Football Association, relegation was not a possible punishment in the circumstances. As a result, the club was punished with a one-season ban from European football and the Belgian Cup. The proceedings were plagued with controversy, with evidence (including witness statements) from an investigation into financial crimes in Belgian football not being made available during these disciplinary proceedings, as well as the impartiality of the prosecutor being called into question.

Rivalries
KV Mechelen's most traditional rival is Racing Mechelen. However the two have sparingly met in the modern era, the last time in 2005, where the game had to be stopped due to crowd violence. Traditionally KV Mechelen was the club of the catholic elite in the city while Racing was set up by the secular, liberal classes, with nationalist sympathies. KV Mechelen has since taken on a more broader support from the Antwerp province and beyond while Racing's support has died down due to being in inferior divisions.

KV Mechelen also have a rivalry with football clubs from the neighbouring town of Lier (mainly Lierse SK and its successors). They additionally have a rivalry with Beerschot Antwerp, which was heightened during the Match fixing scandal of 2017-2019, due to Mechelen's promotion instead of Beerschot despite being found guilty of match fixing in the previous season.

Honours

Domestic
Belgian First Division A
Champions: 1942–43, 1945–46, 1947–48, 1988–89
Belgian Cup
Winners: 1986–87, 2018–19
Belgian Second Division
Winners (7): 1925–26, 1927–28, 1962–63, 1982–83, 1998–99, 2001–02, 2018–19
Belgian Second Division Final Round
Winners: 1981, 2007, 2019
Belgian Third Division
Winners: 2004–05

International
European Cup Winners Cup
Winners: 1987–88
European Super Cup
Winners: 1988

European record
KV Mechelen's Belgian Cup win in 1987 saw the club participate in UEFA club competition for the first time in their history, entering the 1987–88 European Cup Winners' Cup. It proved to be a highly successful campaign, with Mechelen reaching the final undefeated by winning seven of their eight matches en route. They then went on to defeat Ajax 1–0 in the final, Piet den Boer scoring the decisive goal early in the second half. The following season Mechelen played 1988 European Cup winners PSV in the UEFA Super Cup, and defeated the Dutch side 3–1 on aggregate. Mechelen remain the last Belgian club team to have won a European club competition.

As of December 2008.

A = appearances, GP = games played, W = won, D = drawn, L = lost, GF = goals for, GA = goals against.

Results
 Q = qualification round
 PO = play-off
 R = round
 Group = group stage / Group 1 = first group stage / Group 2 = second group stage
 1/8 = eighth finals / 1/4 = quarter-finals / 1/2 = semi-finals
 F = final

Summary of best results
(2 cups)

European Cup/UEFA Champions League:
- Quarter-finalists in 1990
UEFA Cup Winners' Cup (1):
- Winners in 1988
- Semi-finalists in 1989
UEFA Super Cup (1):
- Winners in 1988

Players

Current squad

Out on loan

Former players

Africa
Algeria
  Sofiane Hanni 
Burkina Faso

  Hassane Bandé
DR Congo
  Roger Lukaku 
Europe
Belgium
  Albert De Cleyn
 Marino Sabbadini
  Michel Preud'homme 
 Lei Clijsters
 Koenraad Sanders 
 Philippe Albert 
 Theo Custers 
 Marc Wilmots 
 Christian Kabasele 
 Bjorn Vleminckx 
  Mats Rits 
  Christian Benteke 
  Samuel Greven
Bosnia and Herzegovina
  Edin Cocalić
  Boris Pandža
  Marijo Dodik
  Senad Karahmet
Croatia
  Ljuban Crepulja
Denmark
  Nicklas Pedersen 
Greece
  Sotiris Ninis 
Israel

  Eli Ohana
Montenegro
  Fatos Bećiraj
Portugal
  Sérgio Oliveira
Sweden
  Klas Ingesson
  Kennet Andersson
The Netherlands
  Piet Den Boer
  Erwin Koeman
  Graeme Rutjes
  John Bosman
  René Eijkelkamp
  Wim Hofkens
  Michael Verrips

Coaching staff

Managers
 

  Désiré Bourgeois (1947–53), (1954–55)
  Albert De Cleyn (1955–57)
  Émile Stijnen (1959–61)
  Oliver Gaspar (1960–64)
  András Dolgos (1965–68)
  Piet Teughels (1968–69)
  Keith Spurgeon (1969–70)
  Staf Van den Bergh (1970–75)
  André Bollen (1975–77)
  John Talbut (1977–78)
  Piet Teughels (1979)
  Nedeljko Bulatović (1979–81)
  Kamiel Van Damme (1981–82)
  Leo Canjels (1982–85)
  Ernst Künnecke (1985–86)
  Aad de Mos (1 February 1986 – 30 June 1989)
  Ruud Krol,  Fi Van Hoof (1 July 1989 – 14 January 1990)
  Fi Van Hoof (1990–91)
  Georges Leekens (1 July 1991 – 30 June 1992)
  Fi Van Hoof (1992–94)
  Walter Meeuws (1 July 1994 – 1 August 1995)
  Walter Meeuws,  Willy Reynders (1995–96)
  Willy Reynders,  Georges Heylens (1996–97)
  Franky Vercauteren (1997 – June 30, 1998)
  Rudy Verkempinck,  Gunther Jacob &  Valère Billen (1998–99)
  Gunther Jacob (1999–00)
  L. Clijsters,  V. Billen &  B. Hulshoff (1 July 2000 – 30 June 2001)
  Barry Hulshoff,  Fi Van Hoof (2001–02)
  Stéphane Demol,  Alex Czerniatynski (30 November 2002 – 30 June 2003)
  Alex Czerniatynski (2003–04)
  Rik Vande Velde,  Živica Kanački (1 July 2004 – 25 January 2005)
  André Wetzel,  Živica Kanački (2005 – June 30, 2006)
  Peter Maes (1 July 2006 – 30 June 2010)
  Marc Brys (1 July 2010 – 30 June 2012)
  Harm van Veldhoven (1 July 2012 – 30 December 2013)
  Franky Vercauteren (5 January 2014 – 5 May 2014)
  Aleksandar Janković (8 May 2014 – 6 September 2016)
  Yannick Ferrera (12 September 2016 – 22 October 2017)
  Aleksandar Janković (2 November 2017 – Jan 2018)
  Dennis van Wijk (Jan 2018 – Aug 2018)
  Wouter Vrancken (Aug 2018 – May 2022)
  Danny Buijs (1 June 2022 – 17 October 2022)
  Steven Defour (17 October 2022 – present)

Chairmen history

See also
2017–19 Belgian football fraud scandal

References

External links

 
 Fanclub website
 KV Mechelen at UEFA.COM
 KV Mechelen at EUFO.DE 
 KV Mechelen at Weltfussball.de 
 KV Mechelen at Football Squads.co.uk
 KV Mechelen at National Football Teams.com
 KV Mechelen at Football-Lineups.com

 
Football clubs in Belgium
Association football clubs established in 1904
1904 establishments in Belgium
Organisations based in Belgium with royal patronage
KV Mechelen
UEFA Cup Winners' Cup winning clubs
UEFA Super Cup winning clubs
Belgian Pro League clubs